The Italian language is an official minority language in Croatia, with many schools and public announcements published in both languages. Croatia's proximity and cultural connections to Italy have led to a relatively large presence of Italians in Croatia. Italians were recognized as a state minority in the Croatian Constitution in two sections: Istrian Italians and Dalmatian Italians. Although only 0.43% of the total population is Italian by citizenship, many more are ethnically Italian and a large percentage of Croatians speak Italian, in addition to Croatian.

As of 2009, the Italian language is officially used in twenty cities and municipalities and ten other settlements in Croatia, according to the European Charter for Regional or Minority Languages. It is an officially recognized minority language in Istria County, where it is spoken by 6.83% of the population on the aggregate and closer to 50% of the population in certain subdivisions.

Italian-speaking population

The 2011 Census in Croatia reported 17,807 ethnic Italians in the country (some 0.42% of the total population). Ethnologue reported 70,000 persons whose  first language is Italian or Venetian in 1998 (referring to Eugen Marinov's 1998 data). This population was composed of 30,000 ethnic Italians and 40,000 ethnic Croats and persons declared regionally ("as Istrians"). Native Italian speakers are largely concentrated along the western coast of peninsula Istria. Because of Croatian trade and tourist relations with Italy, many Croats have some knowledge of the language (mostly in the service and tourist industries).

In Istrian contexts the word "Italian" can just as easily refer to autochthonous speakers of the Venetian language, who were present in the region before the inception of the Venetian Republic and of the Istriot language, the oldest spoken language in Istria, dating back to the Romans and now spoken in the south west of Istria in Rovigno, Valle, Dignano, Gallesano, Fasana, Valbandon, Sissano and the surroundings of Pola.

The term may sometimes refer to a descendant of colonized persons during the Benito Mussolini period (during that period immigration in Istria, Zadar/Zara and northern Adriatic islands, given to Italy after World War I, was promoted, 44,000 according to Žerjavić,). It can also refer to Istrian Slavs who adopted Italian culture as they moved from rural to urban areas, or from the farms into the bourgeoisie.

History

Via conquests, the Republic of Venice, from the 9th century until 1797, when it was conquered by Napoleon, extended its dominion to coastal parts of Istria and Dalmatia. Pula/Pola was an important centre of art and culture during the Italian Renaissance. The coastal areas and cities of Istria came under Venetian Influence in the 9th century. In 1145, the cities of Pula, Koper and Izola rose against the Republic of Venice but were defeated, and were since further controlled by Venice. On 15 February 1267, Poreč was formally incorporated with the Venetian state. Other coastal towns followed shortly thereafter. The Republic of Venice gradually dominated the whole coastal area of western Istria and the area to Plomin on the eastern part of the peninsula. Dalmatia was first and finally sold to the Republic of Venice in 1409 but Venetian Dalmatia wasn't fully consolidated from 1420. 

From the Middle Ages onwards numbers of Slavic people near and on the Adriatic coast were ever increasing, due to their expanding population and due to pressure from the Ottomans pushing them from the south and east. This led to Italic people becoming ever more confined to urban areas, while the countryside was populated by Slavs, with certain isolated exceptions. In particular, the population was divided into urban-coastal communities (mainly Romance speakers) and rural communities (mainly Slavic speakers), with small minorities of Morlachs and Istro-Romanians. From the Middle Ages to the 19th century, Italian and Slavic communities in Istria and Dalmatia had lived peacefully side by side because they did not know the national identification, given that they generically defined themselves as "Istrians" and "Dalmatians", of "Romance" or "Slavic" culture. 

After the fall of Napoleon (1814), Istria, Kvarner and Dalmatia were annexed to the Austrian Empire. Many Istrian Italians and Dalmatian Italians looked with sympathy towards the Risorgimento movement that fought for the unification of Italy. However, after the Third Italian War of Independence (1866), when the Veneto and Friuli regions were ceded by the Austrians to the newly formed Kingdom Italy, Istria and Dalmatia remained part of the Austro-Hungarian Empire, together with other Italian-speaking areas on the eastern Adriatic. This triggered the gradual rise of Italian irredentism among many Italians in Istria, Kvarner and Dalmatia, who demanded the unification of the Julian March, Kvarner and Dalmatia with Italy. The Italians in Istria, Kvarner and Dalmatia supported the Italian Risorgimento: as a consequence, the Austrians saw the Italians as enemies and favored the Slav communities of Istria, Kvarner and Dalmatia,.

During the meeting of the Council of Ministers of 12 November 1866, Emperor Franz Joseph I of Austria outlined a wide-ranging project aimed at the Germanization or Slavization of the areas of the empire with an Italian presence:

Istrian Italians were more than 50% of the total population for centuries, while making up about a third of the population in 1900. Dalmatia, especially its maritime cities, once had a substantial local ethnic Italian population (Dalmatian Italians), making up 33% of the total population of Dalmatia in 1803, but this was reduced to 20% in 1816. According to Austrian census, the Dalmatian Italians formed 12.5% of the population in 1865. In the 1910 Austro-Hungarian census, Istria had a population of 57.8% Slavic-speakers (Croat and Slovene), and 38.1% Italian speakers. For the Austrian Kingdom of Dalmatia, (i.e. Dalmatia), the 1910 numbers were 96.2% Slavic speakers and 2.8% Italian speakers. Another contributing factor was the lack of a religious barrier, with Italians often intermarrying with and being assimilated by their more numerous Croatian neighbors. In 1909 the Italian language lost its status as the official language of Dalmatia in favor of Croatian only (previously both languages were recognized): thus Italian could no longer be used in the public and administrative sphere.

After World War I Italy obtained Zara and some northern Dalmatian islands (Cherso and Lussino). During World War II the Kingdom of Italy annexed most of Dalmatia to the newly created Governatorato di Dalmazia. In 1942, 4020 Italians lived in these newly annexed areas: 2220 in Spalato (Split), 300 in Sebenico (Šibenik), 500 in Cattaro (Kotor) and 1000 in Veglia (Krk).

Furthermore, after World War I and the fall of the Austro-Hungarian Empire, 10,000 Italians in the Governatorato took Yugoslav citizenship so they could remain and be accepted by the new Yugoslavian state.

In 1939 Italy conducted a covert census of the non-Italian population (Croats and Slovenes) in Istria, Kvarner, Zadar, Trieste and Gorizia. After the census, Italian authorities publicly stated that the Italian speaking population in those areas had increased. However, data proved that the share of Croatian speakers did not diminish in that period.

For various reasons—mainly related to nationalism and armed conflict—the numbers of Italian speakers in Croatia declined during the 20th century, especially after the Second World War in a period known as the Istrian–Dalmatian exodus, when about 90% Italian-speaking Istrians and Dalmatians left Yugoslav dominated areas in the eastern Adriatic. The 2001 census in Croatia reported 19,636 ethnic Italians in the country.

Geographic distribution and population

In many municipalities in the Istrian region (Croatia) there are bilingual statutes, and the Italian language is considered to be a co-official language. The proposal to raise Italian to a co-official language, as in the Istrian Region, has been under discussion for years.

In various municipalities, census data shows that significant numbers of Italians still live in Istria, such as 51% of the population of Grožnjan/Grisignana, 37% at Brtonigla/Verteneglio, and nearly 30% in Buje/Buie. In the village there, it is an important section of the "Comunità degli Italiani" in Croatia. Italian is co-official with Croatian in nineteen municipalities in the Croatian portion of Istria: Buje, Novigrad, Izola, Vodnjan, Poreč (Pula (Rovinj (Umag (Bale (Brtonigla (Fažana (Grožnjan, Kaštelir-Labinci, Ližnjan, Motovun, Oprtalj, Višnjan, Vižinada and Vrsar. The daily newspaper La Voce del Popolo, the main newspaper for Italian Croatians, is published in Rijeka/Fiume.

Education and Italian language

Beside Croat language schools, in Istria there are also kindergartens in Buje/Buie, Brtonigla/Verteneglio, Novigrad/Cittanova, Umag/Umago, Poreč/Parenzo, Vrsar/Orsera, Rovinj/Rovigno, Bale/Valle, Vodnjan/Dignano, Pula/Pola and Labin/Albona, as well as primary schools in Buje/Buie, Brtonigla/Verteneglio, Novigrad/Cittanova, Umag/Umago, Poreč/Parenzo, Vodnjan/Dignano, Rovinj/Rovigno, Bale/Valle and Pula/Pola, as well as lower secondary schools and upper secondary schools in Buje/Buie, Rovinj/Rovigno and Pula/Pola, all with Italian as the language of instruction.

The city of Rijeka/Fiume in the Kvarner/Carnaro region has Italian kindergartens and elementary schools, and there is an Italian Secondary School in Rijeka. The town of Mali Lošinj/Lussinpiccolo in the Kvarner/Carnaro region has an Italian kindergarten. 

In Zadar, in Dalmatia/Dalmazia region, the local Community of Italians has requested the creation of an Italian asylum since 2009. After considerable government opposition, with the imposition of a national filter that imposed the obligation to possess Italian citizenship for registration, in the end in 2013 it was opened hosting the first 25 children. This kindergarten is the first Italian educational institution opened in Dalmatia after the closure of the last Italian school, which operated there until 1953.

Since 2017, a Croatian primary school has been offering the study of the Italian language as a foreign language. Italian courses have also been activated in a secondary school and at the faculty of literature and philosophy.

See also 
 Minority languages of Croatia
 Italian language in Slovenia
 Dalmatian Italians
 Istrian Italians
 Istrian–Dalmatian exodus

References

External links
Website of the Italian Community of Croatia and Slovenia (in Italian)
Region of Istria Official Website
Official website of Italians from Grisignana/Piemonte d'Istria

Croatia
Languages of Croatia
Italians of Croatia
Language policy in Bosnia and Herzegovina, Croatia, Montenegro and Serbia